Arabic scale may refer to:
Double harmonic scale, a scale with two augmented seconds
Quarter tone scale, or 24 tone equal temperament
A seventeen tone unequal tuning that was historically used to describe Arabic music
Major locrian scale, a scale similar to locrian, also the aeolian mode with  5th and  3rd, Phrygian dominant scale with  5th and  2nd, or Blues Leading-Tone scale with  6th and  tonic.

de:Zigeuner-Dur
pt:Escala árabe